Hervey Range is a rural locality split between the City of Townsville and the Charters Towers Region, Queensland, Australia. In the  Hervey Range had a population of 279 people.

Geography 
As the name suggests, the locality includes the Hervey mountain range. The split between the two local government areas roughly follows the ridge line with the Townsville City Council responsible for the coastal (eastern) side of the locality and Charters Towers Regional Council responsible for the inland (western) side of the locality. Apart from the ridge itself, the land on the Townsville side is generally much lower (50–100 metres above sea level) compared with the higher land on the Charters Towers side (550–600 metres about sea level).

The now-closed Greenvale railway line passes through the locality with three tunnels and the now-abandoned Kadara railway station.

The Hervey Range Developmental Road runs through from north-east to west.

History 
The mountain range and the locality were both named in 1861 by Phillip Somers after Matthew Hervey of Dotswood pastoral station. Somers and Hervey were co-owners of Dotswood station and Somers was also a member of Allan Cunningham's expedition. Barringha is the local Aboriginal name for the Hervey Range which is also their name for the Western Silver Wattle.

In the  Hervey Range had a population of 279 people.

Heritage listings
Hervey Range has a number of heritage-listed sites, including:
 Hervey Range Road: Eureka Hotel[38]
 Page Road (old Hervey Range Road): Range Hotel site

References

Suburbs of Townsville
Charters Towers Region
Localities in Queensland